Andreas Niniadis (born 18 February 1971) is a Pontic-Greek former professional footballer.

Club career
He was one of the dominant players in one of Olympiacos gold eras (1997–2003) and he helped his team to reach seven Greek superleague championships successively and one Greek cup as well. He also played for Pontioi Veria, Ethnikos Piraeus F.C. and Kerkira FC.

He played 23 Champions League matches with Olympiakos, scoring five goals, and three UEFA Cup matches, scoring one goal.

International career
Niniadis earned 17 appearances for Greece, scoring two goals.

Managerial career

Since his retirement, Niniadis has been employed by his former club Olympiacos as a chief scout and an assistant manager. In the 2006–07 and 2009–10 seasons he was the assistant coach of Takis Lemonis and Bozidar Bandovic.

Honours

Olympiacos
Alpha Ethniki: 1996–97, 1997–98, 1998–99, 1999–2000, 2000–01, 2001–02, 2002–03
Greek Cup: 1998–99

References

 

1971 births
Living people
Greek footballers
Greece international footballers
Olympiacos F.C. players
Ethnikos Piraeus F.C. players
A.O. Kerkyra players
FC Dinamo Batumi players
Place of birth missing (living people)
Footballers from Georgia (country)
Association football midfielders
Footballers from Tbilisi